Mao Kun map, usually referred to in modern Chinese sources as Zheng He's Navigation Map, is a set of navigation charts published in the Ming dynasty military treatise Wubei Zhi. The book was compiled by Mao Yuanyi in 1621 and published in 1628; the name of the map refers to his grandfather Mao Kun from whose library the map is likely to have originated. The map is often regarded as a surviving document from the expeditions of Zheng He in addition to accounts written by Zheng's officers, such as Yingya Shenglan by Ma Huan and Xingcha Shenglan by Fei Xin.  It is the earliest known Chinese map to give an adequate representation of Southern Asia, Persia, Arabia and East Africa.

Origin 

The map is thought by sinologist J.J.L. Duyvendak to have been part of the library of Mao Kun, a collector of military and naval material, who might have acquired it while he was the governor of Fujian. In order to distinguish it from other maps in Wubei Zhi, the map was named after Mao Kun by Western scholars such as J. V. G. Mills who studied the map, and therefore came to be known as Mao Kun map in Western sources.

The introduction to the map in Wubei Zhi indicates that the geographical and navigational details of the charts are based on works from the expeditions of Zheng He, and that Mao had "inserted them for the information of posterity and as a memento of [Zheng He's] military achievement". The map is therefore generally considered to be based on maps dating to the time of Zheng He's voyages, and accordingly named as Zheng He's Navigation Map in modern Chinese sources.

According to Mills, the map may not have been the work of a single person, rather it was produced in an office with information added and corrected when new information became available after each voyage. He suggested that this map may have been prepared for the 6th expedition in 1421, with some content added during the course of the expedition, and that the map may, therefore, be dated to around 1422. Others proposed a date sometime between 1423 and 1430. It has also been suggested by J.J.L. Duyvendak and Paul Pelliot that the map may have been partly based on Arab nautical charts.

Format and content

The map was originally in the form of a strip map of 20.5 cm by 560 cm that could be rolled up, but was then divided into 40 pages in the book. The map, after Nanjing and the Yangtze River, shows mainly the coastal regions and islands along the sea route, and places are depicted in their approximate positions along the contour of the coast. The coast of the main land mass is shown largely as a continuous irregular line at the top of the map, with deep V-shaped indentations indicating river estuaries.  As a result of the nature of the map and its focus on the coastal region, the shape of the Malay Peninsula cannot be distinguished, and India became elongated as its interior is omitted.  Pages of the map are arranged from right to left in traditional Chinese book format, starting from Nanjing and finishing in Hormuz. Places in East Africa such as Socotra, Mogadishu and Malindi appear in sequence from left to right on the coast of Africa which is shown as a continuous land mass at the bottom of the sections for India and Sri Lanka.

Also marked on the map as dotted lines are sailing routes, with instructions given along the route markings.  The sailing instructions are given in compass points and distances – the compass point uses a 24-point compass system with a Chinese character denoting each point (each point further subdivided into three), and the distance is expressed in Chinese units of time (each unit a 2.4-hour period) that would take account of the local currents and winds.  Most of the instructions are only given in one direction, although occasionally both the outbound and homeward voyages may also be given.  The instructions are also more detailed for Chinese waters. The latitude is indicated by the height of stellar constellation, a similar system to one used by Arabs.  Four stellar diagrams are given at the end with instruction for positioning the ships in relation to the stars and constellations to ensure correct navigation in two passages – between Sumatra and Sri Lanka, and between Hormuz and Calicut.

The map does not attempt to give a true or consistent representation in its scale or orientation – the scale can vary from 7 miles/inch in the Nanjing area to 215 miles/inch along parts of the African coast, and in some parts, such as the page with Ceylon, it may orientate in several directions within the same page. There are also geographical distortions in the representation of some places such as Java, and the map becomes less complete the further west it goes. The structure of the last portion or most western of the chart suggests that it may have been composed from a number of other maps of varying scales, including one that was just for Sri Lanka, another for the Maldives and a third for the African Coast. Names of places appear to include Arabic terms (for example Jazirah for island) and may suggest Arab, Swahili or South Asian cartographic or geographic influences.

Places on map

There are 499 place names in the map, 423 of these have been identified by Mills, although some locations are identified differently by other authors.  Some misprints have been noted, for example Barawa or Brava is given as shi-la-wa (十剌哇), with shi (十) substituting for  bu (卜).  There are also unexplained omissions of centers known to be active in the period, such as Nakhon Si Thammarat of Thailand.  Some of the places may also have been  located in the wrong position.  Despite its imperfections, it is considered a map of some significance that provides valuable information to historians.

China

Almost half of the map (18 out of 40 pages) depicts the sailing route from Nanjing to the southern edge of China. The first few pages are on the Yangtze River. Of interest is the inclusion of what are interpreted as Paracel Islands, Macclesfield Bank or Spratly Islands – the names Shitang (石塘), Wansheng Shitangyu (萬生石塘嶼), and Shixing Shitang (石星石塘) are noted on the map, although identification of these islands may vary with different authors.

South East Asia

The map shows South East Asia in some details. Its main focus is on the route to the Western Ocean (西洋), a Chinese designation for the stretch of water starting from around Java or Sumatra to the Indian Ocean and beyond. This route from the South China Sea through the Strait of Malacca therefore shows greater details on the places of Indochina, the Malay Peninsula and Sumatra. The eastern fringe of the South China Sea, however, is not defined and with only Borneo and the Sulu Islands shown, and no navigation information on routes to the islands further east is given.

Among the places marked on the map are Chenla (占羅), Champa (占城), Siam (暹羅), Langkasuka (狼西加), Singapore (as Temasek, 淡馬錫), Malacca (滿剌加), Penang (梹榔嶼), Langkawi (龍牙交椅), Sumatra, and Kalimantan.

South and West Asia

Some of the places marked include Bengal (榜葛剌), Orissa,  Sri Lanka, Kollam, Calicut, Hormuz, Oman. Sri Lanka appears significantly larger than it actually is in relation to India.

Africa
The east coast of Africa is shown in sections of the map with Sri Lanka and India with its land mass at the top of the map and the Maldives in the middle.  Places such as Mombasa (慢八撒), Barawa (卜剌哇), and  Mogadishu (木骨都束) are marked on the map. Other locations identified include Lamu Island, Manda Island, and Jubba and Marka in Somalia. What appears to be Malindi (麻林地) is shown in the wrong location to the right of Mombasa, and it has been suggested that this Malindi was meant to represent Mozambique or Kilwa Kisiwani in Tanzania. Another proposal is that this portion of the map represents only the Kenya Coast and that Malindi was the terminus of the journey. In this scenario the place thought to be Mombasa would actually be Faza or Mfasa on Pate Island, and that the order of the places on the map would be correct. This proposal also suggests that the Zheng He voyages never traveled more than six degrees south of the Equator, which would explain the omission of the important trading center of Kilwa in Southern Tanzania.

Popular culture
 The Pirates of the Caribbean franchise featured a map with circular rotating rings that led to spiritual realms and legends of the land beyond death. It uses meridian arcs, equatorial divisions, geographic landmarks and magic keys to guide one's spiritual passage. First introduced in At World's End, this map was presented as map of the character Sao Feng, and referred to as a Chinese allegory map, the navigational charts, the Map of the Land of the Dead or simply Sao Feng's Map in various media, while serving as the route to the Farthest Gate in the film. In an accompanying book for the following film, On Stranger Tides, the map was given the name Mao Kun Map though it was never said onscreen.
 Mao Kun is the name of a unique map in the video game Path of Exile. It is an area inhabited by high-level undead pirates.

Gallery
Mao Kun map
Arrangement in traditional Chinese format, to be read from right to left; first pages on top right, last pages on bottom left.

Stellar charts

See also 
 History of Chinese cartography
 Cartography of China
 Chinese exploration
 Chinese geography

Similar maps 
 Da Ming Hun Yi Tu, c. late 14th century
 Gangnido Map, 1402
 Sihai Huayi Zongtu, 1532
 Kunyu Wanguo Quantu, 1602
 Shanhai Yudi Quantu, 1609
 Selden Map, c. 17th century

Notes

References

Further reading

External links

 Wu Bei Zhi at the Library of Congress
 Mao Kun Explorer - An interactive application to explore the locations and shipping routes on the Mao Kun Map

Historic maps of the world
Historic maps of Asia
Maps of China
Treasure voyages
17th-century maps and globes